Live – The Way We Walk, Volume One: The Shorts is the fourth live album by the English rock band Genesis, released in November 1992 on Virgin Records in the United Kingdom and by Atlantic Records in the United States. The album features a compilation of recordings from their 1986–1987 Invisible Touch Tour and their 1992 We Can't Dance Tour in support of their named studio albums, with focus on the group's hit singles. In addition to the core Genesis line-up of singer/drummer Phil Collins, keyboardist Tony Banks, and guitarist/bassist Mike Rutherford, the group perform with their longtime touring musicians, drummer Chester Thompson and guitarist/bassist Daryl Stuermer.

The album reached No. 3 in the United Kingdom and No. 35 in the United States, where the album reached Gold certification from the Recording Industry Association of America (RIAA) for shipment of 500,000 copies. In January 1993, Genesis released the companion album The Way We Walk, Volume Two: The Longs, which focuses on the band's lengthier material from their We Can't Dance Tour.

Track listing
All songs written by Tony Banks, Phil Collins, and Mike Rutherford.

Personnel 
Genesis
 Phil Collins – lead vocals, percussion
 Tony Banks – keyboards, backing vocals
 Mike Rutherford – guitars, bass guitar, backing vocals

Additional musicians
 Daryl Stuermer – bass guitar, guitar, backing vocals
 Chester Thompson – percussion, drums

Production
 Nick Davis – production, engineering
 Robert Colby – production
 Genesis – production, album design
 Geoff Callingham – engineering
 Simon Metcalfe – engineering assistance
 Icon – album design
 Louis Lee – photography
 Cesar Vera – photography

Charts

Weekly charts

Year-end charts

Certifications

References

Albums produced by Nick Davis (record producer)
Genesis (band) live albums
1992 live albums
Atlantic Records live albums
Virgin Records live albums